Synchronized swimming (Spanish:Nado Sincronizado), for the 2013 Bolivarian Games, took place from 17 November to 20 November 2013.

Medal table
Key:

Medalists

References

Events at the 2013 Bolivarian Games
2013 in synchronized swimming
2013 Bolivarian Games